Olímpico RC is a Spanish rugby team based in Pozuelo de Alarcón, Spain.

History
The club was founded in 1964.

External links
Olímpico RC

Spanish rugby union teams
Rugby clubs established in 1964
Sports teams in the Community of Madrid
Sport in Pozuelo de Alarcón